Dennis Kois is the current executive director of the Yerkes Future Foundation in Williams Bay, Wisconsin.

Biography 
Kois was raised and graduated from Whitefish Bay High School in Whitefish Bay, Wisconsin near Milwaukee, and received a BA from the University of Wisconsin–Milwaukee and an MA from New York University.  He taught in the Graduate Program in Museum Studies at George Washington University from 2001 to 2006.

Kois co-designed the Galleries of Greek and Roman Art at the Metropolitan Museum of Art (1999), as well as co-designed museum exhibitions, including the Met's Jacqueline Kennedy: The White House Years.  He was a protégé of Jeff Daly, the Chief Designer of the Metropolitan from 1979 to 2006.  Additionally, Kois was the internal art director of the Met's website redesign, metmuseum.org, when it launched in 2000. The redesign won both "Best Website" from the American Alliance of Museums as well as "Best E-Commerce Site" from Advertising Age.

In 2001 Kois became the Chief Designer of the Freer Gallery of Art and Arthur M. Sackler Gallery, Smithsonian Institution.  Between 2001 and 2006 he designed a number of  exhibitions, including the costume exhibition "Style and Status".

In 2006 Kois became the executive director of The Grace Museum, in Abilene, Texas. He was appointed to the Texas Commission on the Arts visual arts panel for a two-year term in 2007.

In June 2008, Kois became the director of the DeCordova Museum and Sculpture Park in Lincoln, Massachusetts. Kois was widely credited in the media with re-invigorating the deCordova’s fundraising and program, commissioning or acquiring major sculptures by Antony Gormley, Andy Goldsworthy, Ursula von Rydingsvard and other major international artists for the park. 

In 2014 Kois became President and CEO of the Milwaukee Public Museum, a museum of natural history, science, and culture with annual attendance of half a million annually. During his tenure the museum saw the highest quarters of attendance in its 140-year history  and plans and renderings were announced for a new museum. In August 2018 he resigned, following a Board investigation of a consensual relationship between him and a staff member. Kois and his wife had filed for divorce earlier that same year.  

Kois joined the Burchfield Penney Art Center as executive director in 2019; the Center announced several major donations, including a gift in support of family engagement and education of $1.22 million in 2020. This was the largest gift received by the Burchfield in over a decade. 

In February 2021 Kois was announced as the new executive director of the Yerkes Future Foundation, responsible for the fundraising, conservation and future vision for the historic Yerkes Observatory and its 50 acres of Olmsted-designed grounds.  The observatory, still home to the largest refracting telescope in the world, is widely considered a landmark of modern science.

References

Living people
Year of birth missing (living people)
American graphic designers
University of Wisconsin–Milwaukee alumni
People from Whitefish Bay, Wisconsin
Whitefish Bay High School alumni